Fileteado is a type of artistic drawing and lettering, with stylised lines and flowered, climbing plants, typically used in Buenos Aires, Argentina.
It is used to adorn all kinds of beloved objects: signs, taxis, lorries and even the old colectivos, Buenos Aires's buses.

Filetes (the lines in fileteado style) are usually full of colored ornaments and symmetries completed with poetic phrases, sayings and aphorisms, both humorous or roguish, emotional or philosophical. They have been part of the culture of the Porteños (inhabitants of Buenos Aires) since the beginnings of the 20th century.

The filetes were born as simple ornaments, becoming an emblematic form of art for the city.
Many of its initiators were European immigrants, who brought from Europe some elements of what later fileteado, which became the distinct Argentinian art form known today when mixed with local traditional art styles.
Fileteado was recognized as a unique art after 1970, when it was exhibited for the first time.

History 
Fileteado began in the gray carts pulled by horses, that transported fruits, milk, groceries and bread at the end of the 19th century.

The painter who decorated the carts was called Fileteador, because he performed the job with long-threaded paintbrushes also called "Brushes for making filetes". This is a word derived from Latin "Filum" which means "Thread", referring to the art in a fine line that serves as ornament.

Since it was something that was executed after a cart was done, but before the payment was received, it was a task that had to be performed quickly.

At that time, many specialist painters flourished such as Ernesto Magiori and Pepe Aguado or artists such as Miguel Venturo, son of Salvador Venturo. This last one had been a captain of the Merchant Navy of Italy who established in Buenos Aires, where he dedicated to Fileteado, incorporating a lot of motifs from his home country. Miguel studied painting and enhanced his father's technique, being considered by many the painter who shaped the Filete. The introduction of birds, flowers, diamonds and dragons in the motifs is attributed to him, as well as the design of letters in the doors of trucks. Since there was a tax imposed on very big letters, Miguel made smaller ones but surrounded by very colorful and complex designs to draw attention, design that stood for a long time.

Main formal features 
In the book Filete porteño, by Alfredo Genovese, the anthropologist Norberto Cirio describes the main formal features from fileteado as:
A high degree of stylization
The preponderance of lively colours
The use of shading and highlighting to create the illusion of depth
The preferred use of a Gothic font style or highly detailed letters
The almost obsessive recurrence of symmetry
The framing of each composition when it is finished
The efficient use of available space
The symbolic conceptualization of many of the images represented (the horseshoe as a symbol of good luck, the dragon as a symbol of strength).

Gallery

For a modern example of its use, see the cover of the 2005 album Haughty Melodic by Mike Doughty.

References

External links 

 Jorge Luis Borges's "Inscriptions On Carriages" (English translation)

Culture in Buenos Aires
Argentine culture
Uruguayan culture
Folk art
Decorative arts
Decorated vehicles